Richard Ray (1927–1999) was the United States representative for Georgia's 3rd district from 1983 to 1993.

Richard, Rick, Ricky, Richie, or Dick Ray may also refer to:

Given name and surname
 Rick Ray, American filmmaker best known for his 2006 documentary film 10 Questions for the Dalai Lama
 Rick Ray (basketball) (born 1970), American basketball coach
 Ricky Ray (born 1979), American former professional Canadian football quarterback
 Ricky Ray (1977–1992), one of the three Ray brothers, hemophiliacs were diagnosed with HIV in 1986 due to blood transfusions
 Richie Ray (born 1945), Nuyorican pianist, singer, music arranger, composer and religious minister
 Dick Ray (1876–1952), English association football player and manager

Given names
 Richard Ray Farrell (born 1956), American electric blues guitarist, harmonicist, singer and songwriter
 Richard Ray Larsen (born 1965), United States representative for Washington's 2nd congressional district since 2000 
 Richard Ray Perez, American documentary film producer and director, including of  Unprecedented: The 2000 Presidential Election
 Richard Ray Whitman  (born 1949), Yuchi-Muscogee multidisciplinary visual artist, poet, and actor
 Ricky Ray Rector (1950–1992), executed in Arkansas for a 1981 murder

Similar names
 Dick Wray (1933–2011), American abstract expressionist painter